Alfred James Pilarcik (July 3, 1930 – September 20, 2010) was an American professional baseball player.

Primarily a right fielder, Pilarcik played in over 100 games for three successive seasons (–) as a member of the Orioles. In 1960, his last season in Baltimore, Pilarcik saw less service, but he was stationed in right field at Boston's Fenway Park on September 28, 1960, Ted Williams' final game as an active player. He caught Williams' long drive to right field at the bullpen wall in the fifth inning, then, three frames later, watched helplessly as Williams' 440-foot (134-metre) blast carried over the bullpen for Williams' 521st and final career home run — in the Hall of Fame hitter's last at bat in the Major Leagues.

Pilarcik's career lasted one more season, split between the 1961 Athletics (in his second turn for that franchise) and the White Sox. All told, in six MLB campaigns, he compiled a career batting average of .256 with 22 home runs and 143 runs batted in. Defensively, he recorded a .986 fielding percentage playing at all three outfield positions.

He was signed by Yankees scout Lou Maguolo.

After baseball, he went into the teaching profession and taught at Lake Central High School for 33 years, retiring in 2001.

References

External links
Career statistics from Baseball Reference
Obituary from Northwest Indiana Times

1930 births
Baltimore Orioles players
Baseball players from Indiana
Chicago White Sox players
Kansas City Athletics players
Major League Baseball outfielders
Major League Baseball right fielders
People from Whiting, Indiana
Joplin Miners players
Quincy Gems players
Muskegon Clippers players
Beaumont Roughnecks players
Kansas City Blues (baseball) players
Syracuse Chiefs players
Birmingham Barons players
Columbus Jets players
2010 deaths
People from St. John, Indiana